The N. A. Rimsky-Korsakov Saint Petersburg State Conservatory (formerly known as the Petrograd Conservatory and Leningrad Conservatory) is a school of music in Saint Petersburg, Russia. In 2004, the conservatory had around 275 faculty members and 1,400 students.

History

The conservatory was founded in 1862 by the Russian Music Society and Anton Rubinstein, a Russian pianist and composer. On his resignation in 1867, he was succeeded by Nikolai Zaremba. Nikolai Rimsky-Korsakov was appointed as a professor in 1871, and the conservatory has borne his name since 1944. In 1887, Rubinstein returned to the conservatory with the goal of improving overall standards. He revised the curriculum, expelled inferior students, fired and demoted many professors, and made entrance and examination requirements more stringent. In 1891, he resigned again over the Imperial demand of racial quotas.

The current building was erected in the 1890s on the site of the old Bolshoi Theatre of Saint Petersburg, and it still preserves its grand staircase and landing. As the city changed its name in the 20th century, the conservatory was renamed Petrograd Conservatory (Петроградская консерватория) and Leningrad Conservatory (Ленинградская консерватория).

The school alumni have included such notable composers as Pyotr Ilyich Tchaikovsky, Sergei Prokofiev, Artur Kapp, and Rudolf Tobias and Dmitri Shostakovich, who taught at the conservatory during the 1960s. Amongst his pupils were German Okunev and Boris Tishchenko. 

Composer Nikolai Rimsky-Korsakov taught at the conservatory for almost forty years, and his bronze monument is located outside the building in Theatre Square.

The youngest musician ever admitted to the conservatory was four-year-old violinist Clara Rockmore, who later became one of the world's foremost theremin players.

Directors and rectors

 Anton Rubinstein (1862–1867 and 1887–1891)
 Nikolai Zaremba (1867–1871)
 Mikhail Azanchevsky (1871–1876)
 Karl Davydov (1876–1887)
 Julius Johansen (1891–1897)
 Auguste Bernhard (1897–1905)
 Alexander Glazunov (1905–1928) (formally 1930) – rector
 A. Mashirov (1930–1933)
 Veniamin Buchstein (1935–1936)
 Boris Zagursky (1936–1939) – rector
 Pavel Serebryakov (1939–1952, 1962–1977)
 Yuri Briushkov (1952–1962)
 Yuri Bolshiyanov (1977–1979)
 Vladislav Chernushenko (1979–2002)
 Sergei Roldugin (2002–2004)
 Alexander Chaikovsky (2004–2008)
 Sergei Stadler (2008–2011)
 Mikhail Gantvarg (2011–2015)
 Aleksey Vasilyev (since 2015)

Notable faculty

 Boris Abalyan (conducting)
 Leopold Auer (violin)
 Vladimir Bakaleinikov (viola)
 Louis Brassin (piano)
 Vitaly Bujanovsky (French Horn)
 Georgiy Ginovker (cello, chamber music)
 Edouard Grikurov (conducting)
 Artur Lemba (piano)
 Theodor Leschetizky (piano)
 Nikolai Malko (conducting)
 Ilya Musin (conducting)
 Leonid Nikolayev (piano)
 Cesare Pugni (violin, counterpoint, composition)
 Alexander Radvilovich (composition)
 Nikolai Rimsky-Korsakov (composition, orchestration)
 Anton Rubinstein (piano, the history of piano literature)
 Karl Bogdànovich Schuberth (cello)
 Dmitri Shostakovich (composition)
 Sergei Slonimsky (composition)
 Vladimir Sofronitsky – piano
 Nikolai Tcherepnin (conducting)
 Boris Tishchenko (composition)
 Aleksandr Verzhbilovich (cello)
 Zino Vinnikov (violin)
 Jāzeps Vītols (composition)
 Hieronymus Weickmann (viola)
 Henryk Wieniawski (violin)
 Alexander Winkler (piano)
 Anna Yesipova (piano)
 Nikolai Zaremba (composition, harmony)
 Anatoly Zatin (composition, orchestration, chamber music)
 Leah Zelikhman (piano)

Notable graduates

 Anton Arensky - composer
 George Balanchine – choreographer
 Leonid Balay - composer
 Alexander Barantschik - violin
 Semyon Barmotin - pianist, composer, teacher
 Richard Burgin – violinist, conductor
 Semyon Bychkov - conductor
 Joseph Cherniavsky - cellist, conductor
 Peter Chernobrivets – composer, musicologist
 Leonid Desyatnikov – composer
 Sergei Diaghilev – impresario
 Sandra Drouker - pianist
 Heino Eller – composer
 Valery Gergiev – conductor
 Jascha Heifetz – violinist
 Aida Huseynova – musicologist and ethnomusicologist
 Alexander Ilyinsky – music teacher and composer
 Mariss Jansons – conductor
 Alfrēds Kalniņš – composer, organist
 Artur Kapp – composer
 Leokadiya Kashperova - pianist, composer
 Yuri Khanon – composer, writer, laureate of the European Film Awards.
 Eduard Khil – singer
 Vladimir Khomyakov – pianist
 Nadine Koutcher – opera singer
 Gustav Kross - pianist
 Miroslav Kultyshev - pianist
 Eugene Levinson - Double bassist
 Anatoly Lyadov – composer, teacher, conductor
 Sasha Mäkilä – Finnish conductor
 Witold Maliszewski – composer
 Nathan Milstein – violinist
 Nevsky String Quartet
 Tomomi Nishimoto - conductor
 Nikolai Obukhov – composer
 Leo Ornstein – composer
 Sergei Prokofiev – composer, pianist, conductor
 Gal Rasché - conductor, pianist, teacher
 Nadia Reisenberg - pianist
 Clara Rockmore – violin prodigy, theremin performer 
 Livery Antonovich Sacchetti – Russian music historian
 David Serero - opera singer
 Ilya Serov - trumpeter
 Don Shirley - pianist, arranger, composer
 Dmitri Shostakovich – composer, pianist
 Nadezhda Simonyan - composer
 Kuldar Sink — composer, flautist
 Vladimir Sofronitsky – pianist
 Grigory Sokolov – pianist
 Lyubov Streicher - composer
 Pyotr Ilyich Tchaikovsky – composer
 Yuri Temirkanov – conductor
 Dimitri Tiomkin – pianist, composer
 Elena Tsallagova – soprano
 Vera Vinogradova-pianist, composer
 Zino Vinnikov – violinist
 Solomon Volkov – musicologist
 Ivan Yershov – singer
 Anna Yesipova – pianist
 Mikhail Youdin – composer
 Maria Yudina – pianist
 Stefania Anatolyevna Zaranek - composer
 Anatoly Zatin - composer, pianist, conductor
 Valery Zhelobinsky – pianist, composer
 Efrem Zimbalist - violinist

References

External links

 Official website (in Russian, French and English)
 Documentary A Music Lesson on Saint Petersburg Conservatory

 
Educational institutions established in 1862
1862 establishments in the Russian Empire
Cultural heritage monuments of federal significance in Saint Petersburg
Music schools in Russia